John of Saint-Pol (died 1344) was Count of Saint-Pol between 1317 and 1344.

He was the eldest son of Guy IV, Count of Saint-Pol and Marie of Brittany.

He married in 1319 with Joanna, daughter of John I of Fiennes, and had 2 children:
 Guy V, Count of Saint-Pol, no issue;
 Mathilde (1335–1373), married Guy I, Count of Ligny.

Sources 

John
John
14th-century births
1344 deaths
Year of birth unknown
14th-century French people